"Hometown Unicorn" is the debut single by Super Furry Animals, released on Alan McGee's Creation Records label on 26 February 1996. It reached #47 in the UK Singles Chart and was voted as "Single of the Week" in NME.

The packaging of the single features a quote in Welsh, 'Bydded goleuni!', which means 'Let there be light!'. This practice of including Welsh quotes was followed by every subsequent SFA single up to, and including, "Demons" in 1997.

"It's about this French teenager called Franck Fontaine who disappeared in 1979, then turned up a week later, claiming he had been abducted by aliens," observed Tim Wheeler of Ash. "Of course, there's always the chance that he went on holiday." A photograph of Fontaine appears on the CD single and on the sleeve of Fuzzy Logic.

Critical response
The track appears in Garry Mulholland's book This Is Uncool, a list of the "500 greatest singles since punk and disco".

Track listing
All songs by Super Furry Animals.

"Hometown Unicorn" – 3:35
"Lazy Life (Of No Fixed Identity)" – 2:15
"Don't Be A Fool, Billy!" – 4:07

Personnel
Gruff Rhys – vocals, guitar
Huw Bunford – guitar, backing vocals, cello
Guto Pryce – bass guitar
Cian Ciaran – keyboards, backing vocals
Dafydd Ieuan – drums, backing vocals

References

Super Furry Animals songs
Creation Records singles
1996 debut singles
Songs about extraterrestrial life
Alien abduction in popular culture
Songs based on actual events
1996 songs